Fairfax High School is a public high school in the eastern United States, located in Fairfax, Virginia, a suburb west of Washington, D.C.  The school is owned by the City of Fairfax, but is operated by Fairfax County Public Schools as part of a contractual agreement with the adjacent municipality, County of Fairfax.

The school building, opened  in 1972, is located on Old Lee Highway in eastern Fairfax City. In 2007, FHS underwent a $54 million renovation designed by architectural firm BeeryRio7. Renovations began in March 2005 and added . of classroom space. Student numbers have increased at such a high rate that four trailers have been installed.

The previous campus (1936–72) on Fairfax Boulevard was part of George Mason University for a time and then Paul VI Catholic High School from 1983 to 2020. It is now a retail space.

Demographics
For the 2021-2022 school year, Fairfax High School's student body was 34% White, 23% Asian,   0.2% Native American, 5% Other.

Principals

Academics
67% of students participate in Advanced Placement (AP) courses, with 56% of students passing at least one AP Exam. The graduation rate is 96%.

Test Scores 
Fairfax High School is a fully accredited high school based on the Standards of Learning (SOL) tests in Virginia. FHS is performing above the state median on all SOL assessments including 91% in Reading, 88% in writing, 79% in math, and 79% in science. Fairfax The average SAT score in 2009–2010 for FHS  The average SAT score in 2018 was 1192 on the 1600 scale.

Rankings
In 2010–2011, Fairfax High School was ranked the nation's 201st best high school. In 2019, FHS was ranked as Virginia's 33rd best high school.

Athletics
Fairfax's nickname is the Lions, and the athletic teams currently compete in the AAA Patriot District and Northern Region.  The closest high schools to Fairfax are Oakton ( north) and W.T. Woodson ( south). Fairfax's main rival is nearby W.T. Woodson.

The school has brought home the state championship for cheerleading twice in 2009 and 2013 and the school placed second in 2000, 2008, 2011 and 2012.
The schools other state championships are for boys gymnastics in 2000, and girls gymnastics in 2022, for swim and dive in 2006, and for Field Hockey in 2022

Fairfax athletes who have been first team All-Met selections by The Washington Post, since the 1990–91 school year:

2021-22:: Payton Morrison, Kendall Vess (Gymnastics), Halley Beaudoin, Emma Abromavage (Field Hockey)

2016-17: Emily Deivert (Field Hockey)

2014–15:Rachel Barborek (Gymnastics),
2013–14: Nick Scott (Football), Kiana Sherlund (Softball), Joe Rice (Soccer)
2010–11: Samantha Cormode (Soccer)
2009–10: Kevin Dowd (Boys Cross Country), Joey Kelly (Boys Swimming), Kelli Stockton (Girls Swimming) 
2008–09: Sidarth Balaji & Jason Luu (Tennis) 
2007–08: Emily Ferguson (Swimming), Coach Matt Salerno (Girls Swimming), Sidarth Balaji (Tennis), Lauren Palmucci (Tennis)
2006–07: Gina Winters (Soccer), Sidarth Balaji (Tennis)
2005–06: Gina Winters (Soccer)
2001–02: Sean Doolan (Gymnastics, Gymnast of the Year), Ray Hacker (Gymnastics)
2000–01: Matt Johnson (Golf), Coach Mike Personick, Sean Doolan & Ray Hacker (Gymnastics), Adam Jelinek (Soccer)
1999–2000: Brandon Royster (Football), Matt Johnson (Golf), Sean Doolan & Ray Hacker (Gymnastics)
1998–99: Brad Thomas (Football), Coach Milt Papke (Golf), Sean Doolan & Ray Hacker (Gymnastics)
1997–98: Katie Silverthorne (Field Hockey), John Eastman (Wrestling, Co-Wrestler of the Year)& Justin Potter (Wrestling), Inhar Chong (Outdoor Track)
1996–97: John Eastman (Wrestling), Melanie Brophy (Softball), Inhar Chong (Outdoor Track)
1995–96: Chuck Freeman (Baseball), Linda Young (Softball)
1993–94: Coach Lisa Burner (Field Hockey), Heather Schnelzer (Gymnastics)
1992–93: Tina Boyce (Field Hockey), Heather Schnelzer (Gymnastics)
1991–92: Britta Connolly, Amber Moshos (Field Hockey), Heather Schnelzer (Gymnastics), Earl Smith (Indoor & Outdoor Track)
1990–91: Carrie Hartley (Field Hockey), Katie Gultnieks (Tennis), Mara Cunningham (Basketball), Jamie Dykes (Girls Soccer), Bill Pulsipher (Baseball, Player of the Year), Brian Buchanan (Baseball)

Johnny Reb controversy
The previous mascot of Fairfax High School was a caricature of a Confederate soldier known as "Johnny Reb" (see picture at left). Because of complaints from students and parents throughout the history of the new campus, and at the suggestion of the school's Minority Achievement Task Force, principal Harry Holsinger removed the Johnny Reb symbol in 1985. Student protests, rallies, and a lawsuit followed, which challenged the principal's actions as violating the First Amendment guarantees of free speech. In Crosby v. Holsinger, 852 F.2d 801 (4th Cir. 1988), the 4th Circuit Court of Appeals affirmed the federal district court decision in favor of the principal. After Johnny Reb was removed, the mascot was a set of crossed swords, and an unusual mascot, that resembled a ball of lint, called the Rebel Rouser. In 2003, the school voted on a new physical mascot while keeping the same nickname, a lion (Rebel-lion). In June 2020, "Rebel"  was dropped entirely, and the team name became the Fairfax Lions.

Curriculum
Fairfax High School currently follows the Virginia Department of Education curriculum. The school also hosts Fairfax Academy: School for the Arts, which includes classes such as graphic design and photography. The Academy also features Korean and Chinese. The school has a strong AVID Program, a Reward and Remediation Program, and Honors programs in all areas.

Extracurricular activities

Clubs

 Art Club
 FCA
 Crew
 Student Government
 FBLA
 DECA
 Dance
 Debate
 Gay/Straight Alliance
 Glass Recycling Network
 Green Club
 Hip Hop
 Interact
 Improv
 Indian Student Association
 It's Academic
 Key Club
 Latin Club
 Math Team
 Model U.N
 Peer Mediation
 Project Epsilon
 Rebel Roar (School Newspaper)
 Red Cross Club
 SADD
 Science Olympiad
 Honor Societies (National, Art, English, Spanish, Math, etc.)
 UNICEF
 Fairfax Solidarity (Leftist Political Group)
 Young Democrats
 Young Republicans
 Vietnamese Student Association
 Esports

Find out more about clubs: https://web.archive.org/web/20101125014532/http://fcps.edu/FairfaxHS/clubs/newclub.htm

Chorus
The Fairfax High School Choral Department is currently under the direction of Juliana Woodill and consists of five ensembles divided by skill level, as well as by the requirement of audition. A beginning group, Women's Concert Choir which is available to freshman women only. Intermediate groups, Men's Ensemble and Select Women's Choir which are made available to men in grades 9-12 and women in grades 10-12. Finally, the two auditioned advanced choral groups, Bel Canto, a group of select women in grades 10-12 and Voce, a selective mixed ensemble for students in 10-12th grades. The choral department also has four extracurricular groups the Show Choir, Fairfax Fame, Malebox, and Rebel Treble, an auditioned student-led mixed a Cappella ensemble. Approximately 110 students participate in the Fairfax choirs.

Fairfax choral students also participate in District Chorus, Virginia Honors Choir and All-State Chorus, as well as a regional competition trip in the spring.  Choral groups perform music of many periods and styles and develop musicianship through vocal technique, sight-reading, and music theory. The choir program holds several concerts over the course of the year, the largest, Spring Show is held in early May and a Cabaret is held in the early winter. In addition to the choral concerts held at FHS, students have performed in the Fairfax musicals, at the Fairfax Festival of Lights, George Mason basketball games, corporate parties, Fairfax Corner, the New York City Festivals of Music, Heritage Festival in Atlanta, Georgia, the Smoky Mountain Music Festival in Gatlinburg, Tennessee and Festival Disney.

Band
Fairfax has a strong band program, including a marching band which has won numerous championships. Included in the Rebel Band is the Fairfax High School Drumline, which placed third in the Atlantic Indoor Association (AIA) championships in North Carolina in 2006, third in 2010, and second in 2011.  In 2009, they performed in Dayton, Ohio for Winter Guard International and received 4th place in their preliminary group and 18th in semifinals.  Overall, they placed 18th out of 60 groups. Other teams that accompany the Band program are the Fall Guard (competes with the marching band) and the Winterguard (competes separately). The Fairfax High School Band was under the direction of Ms. Meghan Benson, and won second place at a band competition at the Smoky Mountain Music Festival, in Gatlinburg, Tennessee in the spring of 2008.  The Marching Band won third place in the local Fourth of July Parade independence Day celebration, and was awarded $2000 in 2008.  At the end of the 2008 Marching Rebel season the band received a 1- Superior rating at the VBODA Championships.  The Fairfax High School Band Program received a superior rating at both Marching and Symphonic Band festivals making it eligible to receive the award of Virginia State Honor Band for the first time in the school's 75-year history. The band has repeated the feat every year since. Because of the work of the Marching Band and Symphonic Band along with the work of the orchestral and choral departments, Fairfax was able to earn the title of Blue Ribbon School for the performing arts, which is achieved by Superior ratings at VBODA state marching festival, and a Superior rating for each of the top performing groups at District Festival.  At the competition on their spring trip in the year 2009 to Orlando, Florida, the Rebel band placed second in its class by a margin of less than one point and received the Silver Award Overall in Festival Disney.

Marching Lions

In its 2009 season, the Marching Lions won all of the competitions they competed in and got awards for quality music and general effect.  They performed the show called Heroes, Gods and Mythical Creatures and performed at the Herndon USSBA Regionals, the Oakton Classic, and the James Madison University Parade of Champions.  The Rebels placed first in Class 3A in the Herndon Showcase of Bands without proper uniforms which were destroyed in a flood due to a heating malfunction, also received first at the Oakton Classic.  At the final major competition, the band placed 1st in Class 3A with a score of 84.75. At the VBODA state marching festival the rebels received a superior rating and got straight 1s from all of the judges. The symphonic band received straight 1s the following spring to complete the Virginia Honor Band title.

The 2010 season was also a great success with the show "Nautilus", with the Marching Rebels winning 2nd place in class 3A at the Herndon USSBA regionals (short to Thomas Jefferson by a fraction of a point), 1st place at the Oakton Classic, 1st place at the JMU parade of Champions, and straight 1s from all of the judges at the VBODA state marching festival. The symphonic band received straight 1s the following spring to complete the Virginia Honor Band title.

The band has quickly become one of the best bands in the state and has become widely renowned for its fantastic sound and quick rise to success.

The new band director was welcomed to Fairfax Band in the year of 2011-2012. The new director, Alan P. Johnson led the Marching Rebels into MANY championships. The Fairfax Marching Rebels got 1st place in all competitions and even won the Esprit de Corps award by the Navy. It is awarded to the band with the most professionalism and patriotism etc. The 2011 season was also a great success with the show "The Struggle Within".

In the 2012 season of the Fairfax Marching Rebels, the band went to numerous competitions and won 1st place in almost all they performed in. The show, "Metamorphosis", was performed at James Madison University Parade of Champions and won them 1st place with a score of over 90 points. Also, the Fairfax Marching Band went to two Bands of America competitions and respectively won 4th and 6th place in the finals round of the competitions. Furthermore, they have won the VBODA state marching festival with a superior rating and straight 1s from all the judges.

Orchestra
The Fairfax High School Orchestra Department is currently directed by Gerald Fowkes. The Orchestra consists of four different levels; Beginning, Intermediate, Philharmonic, and Chamber.  The Beginning Orchestra focuses on basic elements of music education and teaches the student fundamentals to prepare them and educate them on music. Intermediate and Concert are 2 different orchestras designed to test and challenge the musicians at a higher level (VBODA pieces grade 4 and 5). And the Advanced Orchestra (playing grade 6 pieces) is the highest level in the Orchestra Department. There are approximately 100 students in the Orchestra program for the enrollment of the 2009-2010 school year. The Orchestra annually participates in District Festival in which the orchestra plays a series of pieces and is graded on them. Often it is believed that the experience is a competition between schools, but it is highly encouraged that the competition be amongst and within the students. The Orchestra also attends a Spring trip annually to various places in America. Some examples include Atlanta, Orlando, New York, and Gatlinburg. The past school year of 2009-2010, the Fairfax High School Orchestra went to Myrtle Beach, South Carolina for the annual Spring Trip. The Orchestra is also known for their pit appearances in school plays such as Beauty & the Beast and A Funny Thing Happened on the Way to the Forum. In the 2017-18 school year, the Fairfax High School Orchestra had the distinct honor of performing in New York's Carnegie Hall.

In 2008-2009, The Fairfax High School Orchestra, along with the Chorus and Band Department earned the Blue Ribbon Award, which is awarded to a school in which the highest section of each music department receives Superiors at District Festival.

Theatre
The FX Players is the Drama Club at Fairfax High School. They are dedicated toward the promotion of theatre in every aspect. The current director is Chris Whitney.

Fairfax Theatre was honored by the Cappies organization with seven nominations, including Best Musical, for the 2009 performance of A Funny Thing Happened on the Way to the Forum, and was invited to perform the opening number at the Cappies Gala at the Kennedy Center in Washington, D.C. In Mr. DiCenzo's first year at the helm, Fairfax theatre achieved major success in 2014 with 13 nominations, including Best Musical, for its production of "9 to 5: the Musical". Fairfax continued its success in 2015 with nine nominations, again including Best Musical, for its production of "Big: the musical".

Fairfax has an orchestra pit that can be covered and uncovered, but it is normally kept in the house floor position due to safety concerns. For the run of The King and I in 2007, however, the pit was opened. It was then closed again, and the orchestra has played at house level since.  The members of the pit orchestra are some of the only musicians in Fairfax County to have ever played a musical in an actual orchestra pit (Hayfield Secondary School also has a working orchestra pit). The pit sinks six feet below the stage.

The FX Players won the State Title at the VHSL One-Act Competition in 2008. They placed second at Districts in 2009.

It's Academic
The "It's Academic" team participates in quiz bowl tournaments throughout Virginia, Maryland, and DC, most notably NBC 4's "It's Academic" game show formerly hosted by Mac McGarry.

The team competes well in tournaments.  In January 2009, Fairfax placed second in the Concorde District at the VHSL AAA District Tournament.  The team advanced to the regional tournament for the first time in several years.  Overall, Fairfax placed third in the Northern Region, tying with Langley High School.

Feeder patterns
Daniels Run Elementary School, Green Briar East Elementary School, Willow Springs Elementary School, Eagle View Elementary School, Providence Elementary School, and Mosaic Elementary School all feed into Lanier Middle School and Rocky Run Middle School, which feed into Fairfax High School.

Notable alumni
Simone Askew (Class of 2014) – First Captain of the Corps of Cadets, United States Military Academy (2017-2018) and Rhodes Scholarship recipient
Pam Baughman-Cornell (Class of 1981) - Former US Women's Soccer National Team player 
Brian Buchanan (Class of 1991) – Former MLB player
Sam Champion (Class of 1979) – Former weatherman on ABC's Good Morning America
Laura M. Elliott – Author of Under a War-Torn Sky
Christina Hendricks – Actress (Mad Men, Good Girls)
William J. Howell – 54th Speaker of the Virginia House of Delegates
Jeremy Jeffress – Former MLB player
Craig Mello (Class of 1978) – Recipient of the 2006 Nobel Prize for Physiology or Medicine
Jason C. Miller – Vocalist/guitarist of the band Godhead
Chap Petersen (Class of 1986) – Virginia State Senator, 34th district
Harold A. "Red" Polling (Class of 1942) – Chairman & CEO of Ford Motor Company from 1990-1994
Bill Pulsipher (Class of 1991) – Former MLB player
Nicholas Rasmussen (Class of 1983) – Director, National Counterterrorism Center
Owen Schmitt – Former NFL player
Nick Scott (Class of 2014) – L.A. Rams safety
Fred Talbot – Former MLB player
Pierre J. Thuot – NASA astronaut

References

External links
 Fairfax High School Official Web Site
 Fairfax High Sports
 Fairfax Academy - For Communications and the Arts
 Fairfax High School Profile
 Fairfax High School Band Department
 Fairfax High School Drama Department
 Fairfax High School Choral Department
 VHSL-Reference website

Public high schools in Virginia
Northern Virginia Scholastic Hockey League teams
Educational institutions established in 1936
1936 establishments in Virginia